is a Japanese surname. Notable people with the surname include:

 Shinobu Ishihara (1879–1963), physician
 Ishihara test, a test to determine colourblindness
 Daisuke Ishihara (born 1971), former football player
 Fujio Ishihara (born 1933), writer
 Kaori Ishihara (born 1993), voice actress and pop singer
 Katsuki Ishihara (born 1939), former freestyle swimmer
 Katsuya Ishihara (born 1978), former football player
 Kazuyuki Ishihara (born 1958), garden designer
 Kuniko "Satomi" Ishihara (born 1986), actress
 Mitsuru Ishihara, animator
 Melody Ishihara (born 1982), former J-Pop singer
 Naoko Ishihara (born 1974), sport shooter
 Shinichi Ishihara (born 1960), singer and (voice) actor
 Shintaro Ishihara (1932–2022), author, politician, governor of Tokyo
 Hirotaka Ishihara (born 1964), politician, Shintaro's third son
 Nobuteru Ishihara (born 1957), politician, Shintaro's eldest son
 Yoshizumi Ishihara (born 1962), actor and weatherman, Shintaro's second son
 Yujiro Ishihara (1934–1987), actor and singer, Shintaro's younger brother
 Takamasa "Miyavi" Ishihara (born 1981), singer-songwriter, record producer and actor
 Taku Ishihara (born 1988), former football player
 Tatsuya Ishihara (born 1966), anime director from Maizuru
 Teruto Ishihara (born 1991), MMA fighter
 Tsunekazu Ishihara (born 1957), game designer, businessman, and president of The Pokémon Company

See also
Ishiwara

Japanese-language surnames